The 2022–23 Turkish Cup is the 61st season of the tournament. Ziraat Bank is the sponsor of the tournament, thus the sponsored name is Ziraat Turkish Cup. The winners will earn a berth in the second qualifying round of the 2023–24 UEFA Europa Conference League, and also qualify for the 2023 Turkish Super Cup.

Competition format 

Source:

First round 
34 Third League and 18 Regional Amateur League teams competed in this round. No seeds were applied in the single-leg round. The draw was made on 5 September 2022. The match schedules were announced on 6 September 2022. 15 seeded and 12 unseeded teams qualified for the next round. Biggest upset was Bigaspor (140) eliminating Akhisarspor (78). Lowest-ranked team qualified for the next round was Boyabat 1868 Spor (144). Highest-ranked team eliminated was Akhisarspor (78).

Source:

Second round 
22 Second League, 29 Third League and 7 Regional Amateur League teams competed in this round. Seeds were applied in the single-leg round. Seeded teams played at home. The draw was made on 16 September 2022. The match schedules were announced on 20 September 2022. 16 seeded and 13 unseeded teams qualified for the next round. Biggest upset was Boyabat 1868 Spor (144) eliminating Bursaspor (40). Lowest-ranked team qualified for the next round was Boyabat 1868 Spor (144). Highest-ranked team eliminated was Kocaelispor (39).

Source:

Third round 
7 Super League, 13 First League, 25 Second League, 22 Third League and 1 Regional Amateur League teams competed in this round. Seeds were applied in the single-leg round. Seeded teams played at home. The draw was made on 4 October 2022. The match schedules were announced on 7 October 2022. 27 seeded and 7 unseeded teams qualified for the next round. Biggest upset was Efeler 09 Spor (130) eliminating Altay (21). Lowest-ranked team qualified for the next round was Efeler 09 Spor (130). Highest-ranked team eliminated was Hatayspor (12).

Source:

Fourth round 
13 Super League, 18 First League, 18 Second League and 5 Third League teams competed in this round. Seeds were applied in the single-leg round. Seeded teams played at home. The draw was made on 21 October 2022. The match schedules were announced on 26 October 2022. 22 seeded and 5 unseeded teams qualified for the next round. Biggest upset was Esenler Erokspor (72) eliminating Erzurumspor FK (25). Lowest-ranked team qualified for the next round was Esenler Erokspor (72). Highest-ranked team eliminated was Yeni Malatyaspor (23).

Source:

Fifth round 
18 Super League, 10 First League and 4 Second League teams competed in this round. Seeds were applied in the single-leg round. Seeded teams played at home. The draw was made on 11 November 2022. The match schedules were announced on 9 December 2022. 13 seeded and 3 unseeded teams qualified for the next round. Biggest upset was Karacabey Belediye Spor (45) eliminating Giresunspor (16). Lowest-ranked team qualified for the next round was Karacabey Belediye Spor (45). Highest-ranked team eliminated was Adana Demirspor (10).

Source:

Round of 16 
14 Super League, 1 First League and 1 Second League teams competed in this round. Seeds were applied in the single-leg round. The draw was made on 23 December 2022. The match schedules were announced on 6 January 2023. 4 seeded and 4 unseeded teams qualified for the next round. Biggest upset was Gaziantep FK (15) eliminating Konyaspor (4). Lowest-ranked team qualifying for the next round was MKE Ankaragücü (17). Highest-ranked team eliminated was Konyaspor (4).

Source:

Quarter-finals 
8 Super League teams competed in this round. Seeds were applied in the single-leg round. The draw was made on 24 January 2023.

Source:

Semi-finals

First leg

Second leg 
Source:

Final

Top scorers 

Bold teams are still in competition. As of January 19, 2023. Source:

Seedings 

Bold teams are still in competition. As of February 12, 2023. Source:

External links
 Ziraat Turkish Cup – tff.org

References 

Turkish Cup seasons
Turkish Cup
Cup